Georg Westling (August 24, 1879 – November 14, 1930) was a Finnish sailor who competed in the 1912 Summer Olympics. He was a crew member of the Finnish boat Lucky Girl, which won the bronze medal in the 8 metre class.

References

External links
 

1879 births
1930 deaths
Finnish male sailors (sport)
Sailors at the 1912 Summer Olympics – 8 Metre
Olympic sailors of Finland
Olympic bronze medalists for Finland
Olympic medalists in sailing
Medalists at the 1912 Summer Olympics